{{Speciesbox
| image = Elseya dentata 3.jpg
| image_caption = Captive 'Elseya dentata in Australia.
| status = LC
| status_system = IUCN2.3
| genus = Elseya
| parent = Elseya (Elseya)
| species = dentata
| authority = (Gray, 1863)
| synonyms = *Chelymys dentata Gray 1863:98
Chelymys elseyi Gray 1864:132 (nomen nudum)
Chelymys elseya Gray 1870:76 (nomen nudum)
Elseya intermedia Gray 1872:23
| synonyms_ref = Thomson, S., Amepou, Y., Anamiato, J. & Georges, A. 2015. A new species and subgenus of Elseya (Testudines: Pleurodira: Chelidae) from New Guinea. Zootaxa 4006(1):59-82. Preview (PDF)
}}Elseya dentata (Gray, 1863), the northern snapping turtle''', is a large aquatic turtle found throughout many rivers in northern Western Australia and the Northern Territory. It is one of three species in the nominate subgenus Elseya.

Etymology
This species is named for the serrated margin of the shell, mostly only visible in younger animals.

Taxonomy
During their revision of the New Guinea Elseya'' a lectotype was set for this species. Further it was placed in a subgenus and as the type species of the genus it is therefore in the nominate subgenus.

References

Elseya (Elseya)
dentata
Reptiles described in 1863
Taxa named by John Edward Gray
Turtles of Australia